Statue Lake is a lake located in the Russian Wilderness, which itself is located in the Klamath National Forest in California. The back wall of the lake is framed with statues, from which the lake received its name.

See also
List of lakes in California

References

Lakes of Siskiyou County, California
Lakes of California
Lakes of Northern California